The 53rd Vanier Cup (branded as the ArcelorMittal Dofasco Vanier Cup for sponsorship reasons), the 2017 edition of the U Sports football championship, was held on November 25, 2017, at Tim Hortons Field in Hamilton, Ontario. The defending champion Laval Rouge et Or made their 11th Vanier Cup appearance while the Western Mustangs made their nation-leading 13th appearance. This was a rematch of the 44th Vanier Cup which was won by Laval and also played in Hamilton. Western defeated Laval, 39–17, to win its first national championship since 1994.

Hamilton was awarded both the 2016 and 2017 Vanier Cup games; it marked the fifth time that the Vanier Cup had been hosted by Hamilton.

Semi-finals 
The Vanier Cup is played between the champions of the Mitchell Bowl and the Uteck Bowl, the national semi-final games. In 2017, according to the rotating schedule, the Canada West Hardy Trophy championship team, the Calgary Dinos hosted the Québec conference Dunsmore Cup championship team, the Rouge et Or, for the Mitchell Bowl. The Acadia Axemen, winners of the Atlantic conference's Loney Bowl, hosted the Yates Cup Ontario championship team, the Mustangs, for the Uteck Bowl.

Scoring

References

External links 
 Official website

Vanier Cup
Vanier Cup
Vanier Cup
Vanier Cup
2017 in Ontario